The Valtellina Orobic Alps Regional Park is a nature reserve in Lombardy, Italy. Established in 1989, it encompasses the northern side of the Orobic Alps, located in the province of Sondrio, on the southern side of the Valtellina (the southern side of the Orobic Alps, located in the province of Bergamo, is instead part of the adjacent Bergamasque Alps Regional Park).

The park has an area of 44,000 hectares, the highest point being Pizzo Coca, 3,052 meters above sea level, while the lowest point is 850 meters above sea level; the average altitude is 900 meters above sea level. The park includes 23,224 hectares of forest and 8,381 hectares of glaciers.

The fauna includes wolves, alpine ibexes, chamoises (around 1,000 specimens), european mouflons (about seventy specimens, introduced in 1971), red deers (about ninety specimens), marmots, golden eagles, black grouses, and western capercaillies, symbol of the park. Twelve areas of the park are designated as Sites of Community Importance and subjected to further protection as part of the Natura 2000 network.

The park is crossed by the Gran Via delle Orobie, a 130-kilometre GR footpath which crosses the entire mountain range, from Delebio to Aprica. Thirty-two mountain huts and mountain shelters are located within its territory.

References

External links 
Official website

Valtellina Orobic
1989 establishments in Italy
Valtellina Orobic Alps